Parliamentary elections were held in Haiti on 11 February 1973. Over 300 candidates contested the election, all of whom were members of the National Unity Party and supporters of President Jean-Claude Duvalier.

Results

References

Elections in Haiti
Haiti
1973 in Haiti
One-party elections
Election and referendum articles with incomplete results